Romani people, or Roma, are the third largest ethnic group in Serbia, numbering 147,604 (2.1%) according to the 2011 census. However, due to a legacy of poor birth registration and some other factors, this official number is likely underestimated. Estimates that correct for undercounting suggest that Serbia is one of countries with the most significant populations of Roma people in Europe at 250,000-500,000. Anywhere between 46,000 to 97,000 Roma are internally displaced from Kosovo after 1999.

Another name used for the community  is Cigani. They are divided into numerous subgroups, with different, although related, Romani dialects and history.

Subgroups
Main sub-groups include "Turkish Gypsies" (Turski Cigani), "White Gypsies" (Beli Cigani), "Wallachian Gypsies" (Vlaški Cigani) and "Hungarian Gypsies" (Mađarski Cigani), as studied by scholar Tihomir Đorđević (1868–1944).

Wallachian Roma. Migrated from Romania, through Banat. They have converted to Eastern Orthodoxy and mostly speak Serbian fluently. They are related to the Turkish Roma. T. Đorđević noted several sub-groups.
Turkish Roma, also known as Arlia. Migrated from Turkey. At the beginning of the 19th century the Turkish Roma lived mainly in southeastern Serbia, in what was the Sanjak of Niš. The Serbian government attempted to force Orthodoxy on them after the conquest of the sanjak (1878), but without particular success. They are mainly Muslims. T. Đorđević noted an internal division between old settlers and new settlers, who had differing traditions, speech, family organization and occupations.
"White Gypsies", arrived later than other Romani groups, at the end of the 19th century, from Bosnia and Herzegovina. Permanently settled mostly in towns. Serbian-speakers. Sub-group of Turkish Roma. T. Đorđević noted them as living in Podrinje and Mačva, being Muslim, and that they had lost their language.
Hungarian Roma.

History
 
Romani, or "gypsies", arrived in Serbia in several waves. The first reference to gypsies in Serbia is found in a 1348 document, by which Serbian emperor Stefan Dušan donated some gypsy slaves to a monastery in Prizren. In the 15th century, Romani migrations from Hungary are mentioned.

In 1927, a Serbian-Romani humanitarian organization was founded. In 1928, a Romani singing society was founded in Niš. In 1932, a Romani football club was founded. In 1935, a Belgrade student established the first Romani magazine, Romani Lil, and in the same year a Belgrade Romani association was founded. In 1938, an educational organization of Yugoslav Romani was founded.

Culture

The Romani people in Central Serbia are predominantly Eastern Orthodox but a minority of Muslim Romani exists (notably recent refugees from Kosovo), mainly in the southern parts of Serbia. Romani people in multi-ethnic Vojvodina are integrated with other ethnic groups, especially with Serbs, Romanians and Hungarians. For this reason, depending on the group with which they are integrated, Romani are usually referred to as Serbian Romani, Romanian Romani, Hungarian Romani, etc.

The majority of Romani people are Christian and a minority are Muslim.  They speak mainly Romani and Serbian. Some also speak the language of other people they have been influenced by: Romanian, Hungarian or Albanian. Đurđevdan (or Ederlezi) is a traditional feast day of Romani in Serbia. In October 2005 the first text on the grammar of the Romani language in Serbia was published by linguist Rajko Đurić, titled Gramatika e Rromane čhibaki - Граматика ромског језика.

Demographics
 
There are 147,604 Romani people in Serbia, but unofficial estimates put the figure up to 450,000-550,000. Between 23,000-100,000 Serbian Roma are internally displaced persons from Kosovo.

Discrimination
A large number of Serbian Roma people live in slums, and so-called "cardboard cities". Many Roma children never go to school. On 3 April 2009, a group of Romani people who had been living in an unlawful settlement in Novi Beograd were evicted on the orders of the mayor of Belgrade. According to the press, bulldozers accompanied by police officers arrived to clear the site early in the morning before the formal eviction notice was presented to the community. The makeshift dwellings were torn apart while their former occupants watched. The site was cleared in order to make way for an access road to the site of the 2009 Student Games, to be held in Belgrade later this year. Temporary alternative accommodation in the form of containers had apparently been provided by the Mayor of Belgrade, but some 50 residents of the suburb where they had been located attempted to set fire to three of the containers. Many of the evicted Roma have spent five nights sleeping in the open in the absence of any alternative accommodation. There have been incidents of FK Rad hooligan (and skinhead) attacks on Roma, such as the death of thirteen-year-old Dušan Jovanović (1997), and also the death of actor Dragan Maksimović, who was assumed to be Romani (2001).

Due to a record of discrimination, human rights reporting mechanisms have consistently drawn attention to the treatment of the Romani people in Serbia.  The United Nations have reported persistent discrimination and social exclusion as a concern, particularly stemming from poor birth registration and identity documentation for citizens, and inequitable access to education, housing, employment, and legal protections. The UN has expressed concerns that the state of Serbia has failed to ensure accountability measures that continually monitor and implement these rights.
 
These persistent challenges cause many Roma to flee Serbia and other Balkan countries for EU countries.  There are cases of Serbian children being granted refugee status in Ireland due to persecution due to Roma identity.  However, with increasingly strict asylum measures in the EU, countries such as Germany are increasingly labeling Serbia and other Balkan countries as “safe countries of origin” despite a lack of measurable improvement in the ability of Roma groups to realize human rights in these countries.

Religion
According to the 2011 Census, most Roma in Serbia are Christians (62.7%). A majority belong to the Eastern Orthodox Church (55.9%), followed by Catholics (3.3%) and various Protestant churches (2.5%). There is also a significant Muslim Roma community living in Serbia, with 24.8% of all Roma being Muslim. A large part of the Roma people did not declare their religion.

Political parties
Roma Union of Serbia
Roma Party

Notable people

Rajko Đurić, professor, journalist, and politician
Srđan Šajn, politician
Boban Marković, trumpeter
Fejat Sejdić, trumpeter
Janika Balaž, tamburitza musician
Šaban Bajramović, folk and jazz singer
Džej Ramadanovski, folk singer
Sinan Sakić, folk singer
Hasan Dudić, folk singer and former boxer
Usnija Redžepova, folk singer
Mina Kostić, pop singer
Predrag Luka, footballer
Dejan Osmanović, footballer
Ahmed Ademović, soldier
Iso Lero "Džamba", criminal

See also
 Romano-Serbian language
 Romani people in Kosovo
 Gurbeti
 Lovari
 Khrlo e Romengo

Notes

References

Sources

Further reading

External links

Romani people in Vojvodina
Participation of Romani in the government in Vojvodina

Ethnic groups in Serbia